The Browns Valley Carnegie Library is a Carnegie library building in Browns Valley, Minnesota, United States, completed in 1916.  It was listed on the National Register of Historic Places in 1985 as the Browns Valley Carnegie Public Library for having local significance in the themes of architecture and education.  It was nominated for being the town's most architecturally significant early-20th-century building and an example of the libraries provided to small Minnesota communities by Andrew Carnegie's philanthropy.

The Browns Valley Public Library operated out of the building until 1997, when it moved to a new facility.  Since then the Browns Valley Historical Society has used it for storage.

See also
 List of Carnegie libraries in Minnesota
 National Register of Historic Places listings in Traverse County, Minnesota

References

1916 establishments in Minnesota
Buildings and structures in Traverse County, Minnesota
Carnegie libraries in Minnesota
Former library buildings in the United States
National Register of Historic Places in Traverse County, Minnesota
Neoclassical architecture in Minnesota
Libraries on the National Register of Historic Places in Minnesota
Library buildings completed in 1916